Chichinadze may refer to:

Dodo Chichinadze (1924–2009), Georgian actress
Lela Chichinadze (born 1988), Georgian footballer
Parmen Chichinadze (1881–1921), Georgian politician 
Zakaria Chichinadze (1854–1931), Georgian literary critic and bibliophile 

Georgian-language surnames